Daniel Alexander Betts (born 10 December 1971) is a British film, television, stage and voiceover actor.

Life
Born in West Sussex, 
Betts trained at the Drama Centre London. As well as appearing in films and television programmes, he has been a voiceover artist on many commercials.

Selected filmography
The Canterville Ghost (1996), as Francis, Duke of Cheshire
The Magical Legend of the Leprechauns (1999), as Mickey Muldoon 
Tom's Midnight Garden (1999)
Fury (2014)
Allied (2016)
War Machine (2017)

Selected television
Atlantic Crossing, as Harry Hopkins
The Crown
The Bill
Cadfael, as Janyn
The Fixer
Sex Education
Fate: Winx Saga (2021)

References

External links

1971 births
Living people
Alumni of the Drama Centre London
British male film actors
British male stage actors
British male television actors
Male actors from Sussex
People from Cuckfield
20th-century British male actors
21st-century British male actors